Gauhati East Assembly constituency is one of the 126 assembly constituencies of  Assam a northeast state of India.  Gauhati East is also part of Gauhati Lok Sabha constituency. The Gauhati East constituency is the only fully urban Legislative Assembly constituency of Assam. Located in the heart of the city of Guwahati, the capital city of Assam, the constituency includes areas such as Pan Bazar, Uzan Bazar, Fancy Bazar, Paltan Bazar, etc. which makes it the most prestigious of all the Legislative Assembly Constituencies of Assam.

Members of Legislative Assembly

 1967: Mahendra Mohan Choudhry, Indian National Congress
 1973: Atul Chandrasaikia, Indian National Congress
 1978: Ajoy Kumar Dutta, Janata Party
 1983: Munin Sarmah, Indian National Congress
 1985: Biraj Kumar Sarma, Asom Gana Parishad.
 1991: Chitta Ranjan Patowari, Indian National Congress
 1996: Biraj Kumar Sarma, Asom Gana Parishad
 2001: Pankaj Bora, Indian National Congress
 2006: Robin Bordoloi, Indian National Congress
 2011: Robin Bordoloi, Indian National Congress
 2016: Siddhartha Bhattacharya, Bharatiya Janata Party
 2021: Siddhartha Bhattacharya, Bharatiya Janata Party

Election results

2016 results

2011 results

See also
 Gauhati
 List of constituencies of Assam Legislative Assembly

References

External links 
 

Assembly constituencies of Assam